Big Bam Boo were a British male pop duo, comprising Simon Tedd and Shark. 
The band released their debut LP, Fun Faith & Fairplay on MCA/Uni in 1989. Tedd later changed his name to Simon Scardanelli.

The single "Shooting From My Heart", entered the UK Singles Chart, on 28 January 1989, reaching #61. In the U.S.A. #21 Mainstream Rock, and was Top 40 in Canada.

Discography

Albums

Singles

References

English vocal groups
English pop music duos